This list is of the Places of Scenic Beauty of Japan located within the Prefecture of Kagoshima.

National Places of Scenic Beauty
As of 1 June 2019, five Places have been designated at a national level.

Prefectural Places of Scenic Beauty
As of 14 August 2018, two Places have been designated at a prefectural level.

Municipal Places of Scenic Beauty
As of 1 May 2018, forty-two Places have been designated at a municipal level, including:

Registered Places of Scenic Beauty
As of 1 June 2019, two Monuments have been registered (as opposed to designated) as Places of Scenic Beauty at a national level.

See also
 Cultural Properties of Japan
 List of Historic Sites of Japan (Kagoshima)
 List of parks and gardens of Kagoshima Prefecture

References

External links
  Cultural Properties of Kagoshima Prefecture

Tourist attractions in Kagoshima Prefecture
Places of Scenic Beauty

ja:Category:鹿児島県にある国指定の名勝